The Hellas quadrangle is one of a series of 30 quadrangle maps of Mars used by the United States Geological Survey (USGS) Astrogeology Research Program. The Hellas quadrangle is also referred to as MC-28 (Mars Chart-28).
The Hellas quadrangle covers the area from 240° to 300° west longitude and 30° to 65° south latitude on the planet Mars. Within the Hellas quadrangle lies the classic features Hellas Planitia and Promethei Terra. Many interesting and mysterious features have been discovered in the Hellas quadrangle, including the giant river valleys Dao Vallis, Niger Vallis, Harmakhis, and Reull Vallis—all of which may have contributed water to a lake in the Hellas basin in the distant past. Many places in the Hellas quadrangle show signs of ice in the ground, especially places with glacier-like flow features.

Hellas Basin
The Hellas quadrangle contains part of the Hellas Basin, the largest known impact crater on the surface of Mars and the second largest in the solar system. The depth of the crater is 7152 m (23,000 ft) below the standard topographic datum of Mars. The basin is located in the southern highlands of Mars and is thought to have been formed about 3.9 billion years ago, during the Late Heavy Bombardment. Studies suggest that when an impact created the Hellas Basin, the entire surface of Mars was heated hundreds of degrees, 70 meters of molted rock fell on the planet, and an atmosphere of gaseous rock was formed.  This rock atmosphere was 10 times as thick as the Earth's atmosphere.  In a few days, the rock would have condensed out and covered the whole planet with an additional 10 m of molten rock.  In the Northwest portion of Hellas Planitia is a strange type of surface called complex banded terrain or taffy-pull terrain. Its process of formation is still largely unknown, although it appears to be due to erosion of hard and soft sediment along with ductile deformation. Ductile deformation results from layers undergoing strain.

Early in the planet's history, it is believed that a giant lake existed in the Hellas Basin.   Possible shorelines have been discovered.  These are evident in alternating benches and scarps visible in Mars orbiting camera narrow-angle images. In addition, Mars orbiting laser altimeter (MOLA) data show that the contacts of these sedimentary units mark contours of constant elevation for thousands of km, and in one case all around the basin. Channels, believed to be formed by water, enter into the basin.  The Hellas drainage basin may be almost one-fifth that of the entire northern plains.  A lake in Hellas in today's Martian climate would form a thick ice at the top that would eventually sublimate away. That is the ice would turn directly from a solid to a gas.  This is similar to how dry ice (solid carbon dioxide) behaves on Earth. Glacial features (terminal moraines, drumlins, and eskers) have been found that may have been formed when the water froze.

Lobate debris aprons
One very important feature common in east Hellas are piles of material surrounding cliffs.  The formation is called a lobate debris apron (LDA).  Recently, research with the Shallow Radar on the Mars Reconnaissance Orbiter has provided strong evidence that the LDAs are glaciers that are covered with a thin layer of rocks. Large amounts of water ice are believed to be in the LDAs.  Available evidence strongly suggests that the eastern part of Hellas accumulated snow in the past.  When the tilt (obliquity) of Mars increases the southern ice cap releases large amounts of water vapor.  Climate models predict that when this occurs, water vapor condenses and falls where LDAs are located.  The tilt of the earth changes little because our relatively large moon keeps it stable.  The two tiny Martian moons do not stabilize their planet, so the rotational axis of Mars undergoes large variations.  Lobate debris aprons may be a major source of water for future Mars colonists.  Their major advantage over other sources of Martian water are that they can easily mapped from orbit and they are closer to the equator, where manned missions are more likely to land.

Lineated Floor Deposits
On the floors of some channels are features called lineated floor deposits or lineated valley fill.  They are ridged and grooved materials that seem to deflect around obstacles.  They are believed to be ice-rich.  Some glaciers on the Earth show such features.  Lineated floor deposits may be related to lobate debris aprons, which have been proven to contain large amounts of ice.  Reull Vallis, as pictured below, displays these deposits.

Ice-rich mantle

Much of the surface of Mars is covered by a thick smooth mantle that is thought to be a mixture of ice and dust.  This ice-rich mantle, a few yards thick, smoothes the land, but in places it displays a bumpy texture, resembling the surface of a basketball. Because there are few craters on this mantle, the mantle is relatively young.  The image at the right shows a good view of this smooth mantle around Niger Vallis, as observed with HiRISE.
Changes in Mars's orbit and tilt cause significant changes in the distribution of water ice from polar regions down to latitudes equivalent to Texas.  During certain climate periods water vapor leaves polar ice and enters the atmosphere. The water returns to the ground at lower latitudes as deposits of frost or snow mixed generously with dust. The atmosphere of Mars contains a great deal of fine dust particles.  Water vapor condenses on the particles, then they fall down to the ground due to the additional weight of the water coating.  When ice at the top of the mantling layer goes back into the atmosphere, it leaves behind dust, which insulates the remaining ice.

Upper Plains Unit
Remnants of a 50-100 meter thick mantling, called the upper plains unit, has been discovered in the mid-latitudes of Mars.  First investigated in the Deuteronilus Mensae region, but it occurs in other places as well.  The remnants consist of sets of dipping layers in craters and along mesas. Sets of dipping layers may be of various sizes and shapes—some look like Aztec pyramids from Central America.

This unit also degrades into brain terrain.  Brain terrain is a region of maze-like ridges 3–5 meters high.  Some ridges may consist of an ice core, so they may be sources of water for future colonists.

Some regions of the upper plains unit display large fractures and troughs with raised rims; such regions are called ribbed upper plains.  Fractures are believed to have started with small cracks from stresses.  Stress is suggested to initiate the fracture process since ribbed upper plains are common when debris aprons come together or near the edge of debris aprons—such sites would generate compressional stresses.  Cracks exposed more surfaces, and consequently more ice in the material sublimates into the planet's thin atmosphere.  Eventually, small cracks become large canyons or troughs. Small cracks often contain small pits and chains of pits; these are thought to be from sublimation of ice in the ground.
Large areas of the Martian surface are loaded with ice that is protected by a meters thick layer of dust and other material.  However, if cracks appear, a fresh surface will expose ice to the thin atmosphere.  In a short time, the ice will disappear into the cold, thin atmosphere in a process called sublimation.  Dry ice behaves in a similar fashion on the Earth.  On Mars sublimation has been observed when the Phoenix lander uncovered chunks of ice that disappeared in a few days.  In addition, HiRISE has seen fresh craters with ice at the bottom.  After a time, HiRISE saw the ice deposit disappear.

The upper plains unit is thought to have fallen from the sky.  It drapes various surfaces, as if it fell evenly.  As is the case for other mantle deposits, the upper plains unit has layers, is fine-grained, and is ice-rich. It is widespread; it does not seem to have a point source.  The surface appearance of some regions of Mars is due to how this unit has degraded.  It is a major cause of the surface appearance of lobate debris aprons.
The layering of the upper plains mantling unit and other mantling units are believed to be caused by major changes in the planet's climate.  Models predict that the obliquity or tilt of the rotational axis has varied from its present 25 degrees to maybe over 80 degrees over geological time.  Periods of high tilt will cause the ice in the polar caps to be redistributed and change the amount of dust in the atmosphere.

Climate change caused ice-rich features
Many features on Mars, including ones in Hellas quadrangle, are believed to contain large amounts of ice.  The most popular model for the origin of the ice is climate change from large changes in the tilt of the planet's rotational axis.  At times the tilt has even been greater than 80 degrees   Large changes in the tilt explains many ice-rich features on Mars.

Studies have shown that when the tilt of Mars reaches 45 degrees from its current 25 degrees, ice is no longer stable at the poles.   Furthermore, at this high tilt, stores of solid carbon dioxide (dry ice) sublimate, thereby increasing the atmospheric pressure.  This increased pressure allows more dust to be held in the atmosphere.  Moisture in the atmosphere will fall as snow or as ice frozen onto dust grains.  Calculations suggest this material will concentrate in the mid-latitudes.  General circulation models of the Martian atmosphere predict accumulations of ice-rich dust in the same areas where ice-rich features are found.
When the tilt begins to return to lower values, the ice sublimates (turns directly to a gas) and leaves behind a lag of dust.   The lag deposit caps the underlying material so with each cycle of high tilt levels, some ice-rich mantle remains behind.   Note, that the smooth surface mantle layer probably represents only relative recent material.

Origin of Dao Vallis

Dao Vallis begins near a large volcano, called Hadriaca Patera, so it is thought to have received water when hot magma melted huge amounts of ice in the frozen ground.   The partially circular depressions on the left side of the channel in the adjacent image suggests that groundwater sapping also contributed water.

Dust devil tracks

Many areas on Mars, including the Hellas quadrangle, experience the passage of giant dust devils.  A thin coating of fine bright dust covers most of the martian surface.  When a dust devil goes by it blows away the coating and exposes the underlying dark surface.  Dust devils have been seen from the ground and from orbiting spacecraft.  They have even blown the dust off of the solar panels of the two Rovers on Mars, thereby greatly extending their lives.  The twin Rovers were designed to last for 3 months, instead they have lasted more than five years.  The pattern of the tracks have been shown to change every few months.  A study that combined data from the High Resolution Stereo Camera (HRSC) and the Mars Orbiter Camera (MOC) found that some large dust devils on Mars have a diameter of 700 meters and last at least 26 minutes.

Evidence for possible recent liquid water

The Mars Reconnaissance Orbiter discovered changes on the wall of Penticton Crater between 1999 and 2004.  One interpretation of the changes was that they were caused by water flowing on the surface.  A further analysis, published about a year later, revealed that the deposit could have been caused by gravity moving material down slope (a landslide).  The slope where the deposit was sighted was close to the stability limits of dry, unconsolidated materials.

Other Craters
Impact craters generally have a rim with ejecta around them, in contrast volcanic craters usually do not have a rim or ejecta deposits.  As craters get larger (greater than 10 km in diameter) they usually have a central peak. The peak is caused by a rebound of the crater floor following the impact.  Sometimes craters will display layers.  Craters can show us what lies deep under the surface.

Glacial Features
Glaciers, loosely defined as patches of currently or recently flowing ice, are thought to be present across large but restricted areas of the modern Martian surface, and are inferred to have been more widely distributed at times in the past. Lobate convex features on the surface known as viscous flow features and lobate debris aprons, which show the characteristics of non-Newtonian flow, are now almost unanimously regarded as true glaciers.

A climate model, reported in the journal Science in 2006, found that large amounts of ice should accumulate in the Hellas region, in the same places where glaciers are observed.  Water is transported from the south polar area to northern Hellas and falls as precipitation.

Channels

There is enormous evidence that water once flowed in river valleys on Mars.  Images of curved channels have been seen in images from Mars spacecraft dating back to the early seventies with the Mariner 9 orbiter.  Indeed, a study published in June 2017, calculated that the volume of water needed to carve all the channels on Mars was even larger than the proposed ocean that the planet may have had.  Water was probably recycled many times from the ocean to rainfall around Mars.

Layers
Many places on Mars show rocks arranged in layers. Rock can form layers in a variety of ways.  Volcanoes, wind, or water can produce layers.
A detailed discussion of layering with many Martian examples can be found in Sedimentary Geology of Mars.

Honeycomb terrain
These relatively flat-lying “cells” appear to have concentric layers or bands, similar to a honeycomb. This "honeycomb" terrain was first discovered in the northwestern part of Hellas.   The geologic process responsible for creating these features remains unresolved.  Some calculations indicate that this formation may have been caused by ice moving up through the ground in this region.  The ice layer would have been between 100 m and 1 km thick.  When one substance moves up through another denser substance, it is called a diapir.  So, it seems that large masses of ice have pushed up layers of rock into domes that were eroded.  After erosion removed the top of the layered domes, circular features remained.

Diapirs are thought to be responsible for features on Neptune's moon Triton, Jupiter's moon Europa, Saturn's moon Enceladus, and Uranus's moon Miranda.

Gullies

Gullies occur on steep slopes, especially on the walls of craters. Gullies are believed to be relatively young because they have few, if any craters. Moreover, they lie on top of sand dunes which themselves are considered to be quite young. Usually, each gully has an alcove, channel, and apron. Some studies have found that gullies occur on slopes that face all directions, others have found that the greater number of gullies are found on poleward facing slopes, especially from 30-44 S.

For years, many believed that gullies were formed by running water, but further observations demonstrate that they may be formed by dry ice.  Recent studies describe using the High Resolution Imaging Science Experiment (HiRISE) camera on MRO to examine gullies at 356 sites, starting in 2006. Thirty-eight of the sites showed active gully formation.  Before-and-after images demonstrated the timing of this activity coincided with seasonal carbon dioxide frost and temperatures that would not have allowed for liquid water.  When dry ice frost changes to a gas, it may lubricate dry material to flow especially on steep slopes.  In some years frost, perhaps as thick as 1 meter, triggers avalanches. This frost contains mostly dry ice, but also has tiny amounts of water ice.

Polygons

Some surfaces on Mars display polygons.  These may be of different sizes.  Polygons are an example of patterned ground.  Polygonal, patterned ground is quite common in some regions of Mars.

Exposed ice sheets

Thick deposits of ice were found by a team of researchers using instruments on board the Mars Reconnaissance Orbiter (MRO).  The scientists found eight eroding slopes showing exposed water ice sheets as thick as 100 meters. Seven of the locations were in the southern hemisphere.  Much evidence of buried ice under the ground on vast regions of Mars has already been found by past studies, but this study found that the ice was only covered by a layer of about 1 or 2 meters thick of soil.  Shane Byrne of the University of Arizona Lunar and Planetary Laboratory, Tucson,  one of the co-authors remarked that future colonists of the Red Planet would be able to gather up ice with just a bucket and shovel.
The layered ice is exposed in triangular shaped depressions.  One wall is very steep and faces the pole.  The fact that water-ice makes up the layers was confirmed by Compact Reconnaissance Imaging Spectrometer for Mars (CRISM) on board the Mars Reconnaissance Orbiter (MRO).  The spectra gathered by CRISM showed strong signals of water.  The layers are especially prominent in depressions in Hellas quadrangle as shown in the enlarged views below.

Besides being of great value to future explorers, these ice layers could help us better understand the climate history of Mars.  They provide a record of the past.  The large variations in the tilt of the planet cause dramatic climate variations.  Mars does not possess a large moon to keep its tilt stable.  Today, ice is concentrated at the poles, with a greater tilt, more ice will exist at mid-latitudes.
These climate changes may be able to be measured with study of these layers.

These triangular depressions are similar to those in scalloped terrain.  However scalloped terrain, displays a gentle equator-facing slope and is rounded.

Scalloped topography

Scalloped topography is common in the mid-latitudes of Mars, between 45° and 60° north and south. It is particularly prominent in the region of Utopia Planitia, in the northern hemisphere, and in the region of Peneus and Amphitrites Paterae in the southern hemisphere. Such topography consists of shallow, rimless depressions with scalloped edges, commonly referred to as "scalloped depressions" or simply "scallops". Scalloped depressions can be isolated or clustered and sometimes seem to coalesce. A typical scalloped depression displays a gentle equator-facing slope and a steeper pole-facing scarp.  Scalloped depressions are believed to form from the removal of subsurface material, possibly interstitial ice, by sublimation (direct transition of a material from the solid to the gas phase with no intermediate liquid stage). This process may still be happening at present.  This topography may be of great importance for future colonization of Mars because it may point to deposits of pure ice.

Pits
Some places on Mars display pits.  It is believed that a void was created and material collapsed into the pits.  These pits are probably most commonly formed when ice leaves the ground thereby creating a void.  In the thin atmosphere of Mars, ice will sublimate, especially if a crack occurs. Sublimation is when a solid turns directly into a gas. Dry ice does this on the Earth.  Some pits are associated with cracks in the surface.

Additional Images in Hellas quadrangle

Other Mars quadrangles

Interactive Mars map

See also

 Brain terrain
 Climate of Mars
 Diapir
 Dust devil tracks
 Geology of Mars
 Glacier
 Glaciers on Mars
 HiRISE
 HiWish program
 Impact crater
 Latitude dependent mantle
 Lakes on Mars
 Lineated valley fill
 List of quadrangles on Mars
 Lobate debris apron 
 Martian Gullies
 Ore resources on Mars
 Pedestal crater
 Phoenix (spacecraft)
 Polygonal patterned ground
 Scalloped topography
 Upper Plains Unit
 Vallis 
 Water on Mars

References

External links

 Lakes on Mars - Nathalie Cabrol (SETI Talks)
 Martian Ice - Jim Secosky - 16th Annual International Mars Society Convention
 https://www.youtube.com/watch?v=kpnTh3qlObk[T. Gordon Wasilewski - Water on Mars - 20th Annual International Mars Society Convention]  Describes how to get water from ice in the ground

 
Mars